

Teams

Changes from last season
Teams promoted from 1983 to 1984 Yugoslav Second League
 Iskra
 Sutjeska

Teams relegated to 1984–85 Yugoslav Second League
 17th place: Olimpija
 18th place: Čelik

Overview

League table

Results

Winning squad

Top scorers

Attendance

Overall league attendance per match: 8,533 spectators

See also
1984–85 Yugoslav Second League
1984–85 Yugoslav Cup

External links
Yugoslavia Domestic Football Full Tables

Yugoslav First League seasons
Yugo
1984–85 in Yugoslav football